Artist Lake is a glacial kettle hole lake located in Middle Island, New York south of Middle Country Road (Route 25) in central Long Island.

Artist Lake holds a diverse warm water fish community including largemouth bass and pickerel. It is also one of Long Island's better waters for crappie and perch.

Species present (naturally reproducing):
Largemouth bass
Chain pickerel
Bluegill
Pumpkinseed
Black crappie
Yellow perch
White perch
Brown bullhead

Access is via Town of Brookhaven's park located directly off of Middle Country Road.

Directions: Take Route 25 to Middle Island; lake is on the south side of the road opposite of what used to be Kmart.

Restrictions: Hand launched boats are allowed; shoreline access is available but limited.

Artist Lake has an irregular shape that was formed by the melting of massive chunks of partially buried glacial ice. 
A lake formed this way is called a kettlehole. Artist Lake has no inlet or outlet streams. Therefore, the water level is determined by groundwater that gradually changes during periods of dry or wet weather.

The south and west basins are shallower, particularly the west basin which does not exceed two feet in depth.

Most of the shoreline of Artist Lake is privately owned. Public access is available from Middle Country Road (Route 25). 
Canoes or other hand carried boats can be launched from a small Brookhaven town park on the south side of the road.

Fishing from shore is also possible. There is room for five or six cars to pull off the highway.

Artist Lake is located on NYS Route 25 in Middle Island just east of Suffolk County Route 21.

See also
 Brookhaven

References

Brookhaven, New York
Lakes of New York (state)
Tourist attractions on Long Island
Lakes of Suffolk County, New York
Tourist attractions in Suffolk County, New York
Kettle lakes in the United States